Quistinic is a commune in the Morbihan department of Brittany in north-western France.  It is twinned with the rural village of Loughshinny in County Dublin, Ireland.

Population

Inhabitants of Quistinic are called in French .

Toponymy

Quistinic is a Breton word. It means Chesnust Forest.

Geography

Historically, Quistinic belongs to the Vannetais. The river Blavet forms the commune's eastern and southern borders. The neighborhood of the hamlet of Poul Fetan, in Quistinic,  offers a nice view over the Blavet valley. Quistinic is characterised by bocage landscape.

thumb|center|The Blavet valley in Quistinic.

Neighboring communes
Quistinic is border by Bubry and Melrand to the north, by Saint-Barthélemy and Baud to the east, by Languidic to the south and by Lanvaudan to the west.

Map

Village of Poul-Fétan 

 which etymologically means "Lavoir (wash-house) of the fountain" is an historical center located within Quistinic. This hamlet from the sixteenth century has been completely restored with traditional materials. The houses are covered with thatch, there is the old  and the ancient hemp rusting containers. Visitors can notably enter the Longère located in a farmhouse and witness an interior of the early twentieth century reconstituted and observe the craftsmen at work showing their expertise.

Gallery

See also
Communes of the Morbihan department

References

External links

 Cultural Heritage 
 Mayors of Morbihan Association 

Communes of Morbihan